Donatella Tesei (born 17 June 1958) is an Italian politician and lawyer, currently President of the Umbria region.

Biography
Tesei is a civil and administrative lawyer. She served as mayor of Montefalco from 2009 to 2019.

She joined the right-wing populist League party and served as the member of the Italian Senate from Terni since 23 March 2018.

Tesei was elected President of Umbria at the 2019 regional election and took office on 11 November 2019.

References

External links
 
 

1958 births
Living people
Senators of Legislature XVIII of Italy
University of Perugia alumni
People from Foligno
People from Terni
Presidents of Umbria
Lega Nord politicians
Women mayors of places in Italy
21st-century Italian lawyers
Italian women lawyers
21st-century Italian politicians
21st-century Italian women politicians
21st-century women lawyers
21st-century Italian women
Women members of the Senate of the Republic (Italy)